The following is a list of Registered Historic Places in Allegan County, Michigan.



|}

See also

List of Registered Historic Places in Michigan
List of Michigan State Historic Sites in Allegan County, Michigan
 National Register of Historic Places listings in Michigan
 Listings in neighboring counties: Barry, Kalamazoo, Kent, Ottawa, Van Buren

References

Allegan County
Allegan County, Michigan
Buildings and structures in Allegan County, Michigan